The 19th Annual Grammy Awards were held on February 19, 1977, and were broadcast live on American television (CBS). It was the seventh and final year Andy Williams hosted the telecast. The ceremony recognized accomplishments by musicians from the year 1976.

Helen Hayes's win made her the second person to become an EGOT.

Award winners
Record of the Year
"This Masquerade" - George Benson (artist) & Tommy LiPuma (producer)
Album of the Year
Songs in the Key of Life - Stevie Wonder (artist) & Stevie Wonder (producer)
Song of the Year
"I Write the Songs" - Bruce Johnston (songwriter) (for  performed by Barry Manilow)
Best New Artist
Starland Vocal Band

Children's
Best Recording for Children
Karl Böhm (conductor) & Hermione Gingold for Prokofiev: Peter and the Wolf/Saint-Saëns: Carnival of the Animals

Classical
Best Classical Orchestral Performance
Raymond Minshull (producer), Georg Solti (conductor) & the Chicago Symphony Orchestra for Strauss: Also Sprach Zarathustra
Best Classical Vocal Soloist Performance
Beverly Sills for Herbert: Music of Victor Herbert
Best Opera Recording
Michael Woolcock (producer), Lorin Maazel (conductor), Leona Mitchell, Willard White & the Cleveland Orchestra for Gershwin: Porgy and Bess
Best Choral Performance (other than opera)
André Previn (conductor), Arthur Oldham (choirmaster) & the London Symphony Orchestra & Chorus for Rachmaninoff: The Bells
Best Classical Performance, Instrumental Soloist or Soloists (with orchestra)
Daniel Barenboim (conductor), Arthur Rubinstein & the London Philharmonic Orchestra for Beethoven: The Five Piano Concertos
Best Classical Performance, Instrumental Soloist or Soloists (without orchestra)
Vladimir Horowitz for Horowitz Concerts 1975/76
Best Chamber Music Performance
David Munrow (conductor) & the Early Music Consort of London for The Art of Courtly Love
Best Classical Album
Max Wilcox (producer), Daniel Barenboim (conductor), Arthur Rubinstein & the London Philharmonic for Beethoven: The Five Piano Concertos

Comedy
Best Comedy Recording
Richard Pryor for Bicentennial Nigger

Composing and arranging
Best Instrumental Composition
Chuck Mangione (composer) for Bellavia
Album of Best Original Score Written for a Motion Picture or Television Special
Norman Whitfield (composer) for Car Wash performed by Rose Royce
Best Instrumental Arrangement
Chick Corea (arranger) for "Leprechaun's Dream"
Best Arrangement Accompanying Vocalist(s)
James William Guercio & Jimmie Haskell (arrangers) for "If You Leave Me Now" performed by Chicago
Best Arrangement for Voices (duo, group or chorus)
Starland Vocal Band (arranger) for "Afternoon Delight"

Country
Best Country Vocal Performance, Female
Emmylou Harris for Elite Hotel
Best Country Vocal Performance, Male
Ronnie Milsap for "(I'm a) Stand By My Woman Man"
Best Country Vocal Performance by a Duo or Group
Amazing Rhythm Aces for "The End Is Not in Sight (The Cowboy Tune)"
Best Country Instrumental Performance
Chet Atkins & Les Paul for Chester and Lester
Best Country Song
Larry Gatlin (songwriter) for "Broken Lady"

Folk
Best Ethnic or Traditional Recording
John Hartford for Mark Twang

Gospel
Best Gospel Performance (other than soul gospel)
The Oak Ridge Boys for "Where the Soul Never Dies"
Best Soul Gospel Performance
Mahalia Jackson for How I Got Over
Best Inspirational Performance
Gary S. Paxton for The Astonishing, Outrageous, Amazing, Incredible, Unbelievable, Different World of Gary S. Paxton

Jazz
Best Jazz Performance by a Soloist (Instrumental)
Count Basie for Basie & Zoot
Best Jazz Performance by a Group
Chick Corea for The Leprechaun
Best Jazz Performance by a Big Band
Duke Ellington for The Ellington Suites
 Best Jazz Vocal Performance
Ella Fitzgerald for Fitzgerald and Pass... Again

Latin
Best Latin Recording
Eddie Palmieri for Unfinished Masterpiece

Musical show
Best Cast Show Album
Luigi Creatore & Hugo Peretti (producers) & various artists for Bubbling Brown Sugar

Packaging and notes
Best Album Package
John Berg (art director) for Chicago X performed by Chicago
Best Album Notes
Dan Morgenstern (notes writer) for The Changing Face of Harlem, the Savoy Sessions performed by Various Artists

Pop
Best Pop Vocal Performance, Female
Hasten Down the Wind (album) - Linda Ronstadt
Best Pop Vocal Performance, Male
Songs in the Key of Life (album) - Stevie Wonder
Best Pop Vocal Performance by a Duo, Group or Chorus
"If You Leave Me Now" - Chicago
Best Pop Instrumental Performance
Breezin' - George Benson

Production and engineering
Best Engineered Recording, Non-Classical
Breezin' - Al Schmitt (engineer)
Best Engineered Recording, Classical
Gershwin: Rhapsody in Blue - Edward (Bud) T. Graham, Milton Cherin, Ray Moore (engineers)
Best Producer of the Year
Stevie Wonder

R&B
    
Best R&B Vocal Performance, Female
Natalie Cole for "Sophisticated Lady (She's a Different Lady)"
Best R&B Vocal Performance, Male
Stevie Wonder for "I Wish"
Best R&B Vocal Performance by a Duo, Group or Chorus
Billy Davis Jr. & Marilyn McCoo for "You Don't Have to Be a Star (To Be in My Show)"
Best R&B Instrumental Performance
George Benson for "Theme From Good King Bad"
Best Rhythm & Blues Song
Boz Scaggs & David Paich (songwriters) for "Lowdown" performed by Boz Scaggs

Spoken
Best Spoken Word Recording
Henry Fonda, Helen Hayes, James Earl Jones & Orson Welles for Great American Documents

References

 019
1977 in California
1977 music awards
1977 in Los Angeles
1977 in American music
Grammy
February 1977 events in the United States